Saulteaux 159A is an Indian reserve of the Saulteaux First Nation in Saskatchewan. It is 48 miles north of North Battleford, and on the north shore of Birsh Lake. In the 2016 Canadian Census, it recorded a population of 26 living in 7 of its 10 total private dwellings.

References

Indian reserves in Saskatchewan
Division No. 16, Saskatchewan